Ngozi Whitney Onwumere, also known as Betty Onwumere (born January 23, 1992) is an American– Nigerian sprinter and bobsledder who competes internationally for Nigeria. In track, Onwumere specializes in the 100 metres, 200 metres, 400 metres and 4 x 100 metres relay. Ngozi claimed gold alongside Blessing Okagbare, Lawretta Ozoh and Cecilia Francis in the 4 x 100 metres relay at the 2015 All-Africa Games in Brazzaville, Congo. She also represented Nigeria at the 2015 IAAF World Relays in Nassau, Bahamas. She represented Nigeria at the 2018 Winter Olympics in 2-women bobsled.

Onwumere was born and raised in Mesquite, Texas, where she graduated from Mesquite High School. She attended the University of Houston.

References

External links
 
 
 Ngozi Onwumere at All-Athletics

1992 births
Living people
Nigerian female sprinters
Nigerian female bobsledders
African Games gold medalists for Nigeria
African Games medalists in athletics (track and field)
African Games silver medalists for Nigeria
Athletes (track and field) at the 2015 African Games
Olympic bobsledders of Nigeria
Bobsledders at the 2018 Winter Olympics
American female sprinters
American female bobsledders
Track and field athletes from Texas
People from Mesquite, Texas
Sportspeople from the Dallas–Fort Worth metroplex
African-American sportswomen
American sportspeople of Nigerian descent
Mesquite High School (Texas) alumni
21st-century African-American sportspeople
21st-century African-American women